The 2014–15 Virginia Cavaliers women's basketball team represented the University of Virginia during the 2014–15 college basketball season. Joanne Boyle resumed the responsibility as head coach for a fourth consecutive season. The Cavaliers were members of the Atlantic Coast Conference, and played their home games at the John Paul Jones Arena. They finished the season 17–14, 7–9 in ACC play to finish in a three-way tie for ninth place. They lost in the second round of the ACC women's tournament to Miami (FL). They were invited to the Women's National Invitation Tournament, where they lost in the first round to Old Dominion.

2014–15 media

Virginia Cavaliers Sports Network
The Virginia Cavaliers Sports Network will broadcast select Cavaliers games on WINA. John Freeman, Larry Johnson, and Myron Ripley will provide the call for the games. Games not broadcast on WINA can be listened to online through Cavaliers Live at virginiasports.com.

Roster

Schedule

|-
!colspan=9 style="background:#00214E; color:#F56D22;"|Non-conference regular season

|-
!colspan=9 style="background:#00214E; color:#F56D22;"|Conference regular season

|-
!colspan=9 style="background:#00214E; color:#F56D22;"| 2015 ACC Tournament

|-
!colspan=9 style="background:#00214E; color:#F56D22;"|WNIT

Rankings
2014–15 NCAA Division I women's basketball rankings

See also
 2014–15 Virginia Cavaliers men's basketball team

References

Virginia Cavaliers women's basketball seasons
Virginia
2015 Women's National Invitation Tournament participants